King of Kings: Live is the second live album of Puerto Rican singer Don Omar, released on October 13, 2007 through Machete Music. It was nominated for a Lo Nuestro Award for Urban Album of the Year on the Premio Lo Nuestro 2009. A DVD of the concert was also released which included 3 music videos.

Track listing

CD 

 The last four song on disc 2 are studio recorded songs. Meaning they're not from a live performance nor concert.

DVD

Charts

See also
List of number-one Billboard Latin Rhythm Albums of 2007

References

Don Omar live albums
2007 live albums
Albums produced by Luny Tunes